Gaoual is a prefecture located in the Boké Region of Guinea. The capital is Gaoual. The prefecture covers an area of 7,758 km.² and has a population of 194,245.

Sub-prefectures
The prefecture is divided administratively into 8 sub-prefectures:
 Gaoual-Centre
 Foulamory
 Kakony
 Koumbia
 Kounsitel
 Malanta
 Touba
 Wendou M'Bour

Prefectures of Guinea
Boké Region